Mt St Mary's Mission School is a private Catholic primary and secondary school, located in the Wedza District of the Mashonaland East Province of Zimbabwe. The school is located at the foot of Mt Rusunzwe.

History and operations
The mission was established in 1954 by Father Beckenhoff, a German Jesuit who worked as a missionary in Wedza and other areas in Zimbabwe.

The primary school was established alongside the mission and a transition to a secondary school followed gradually. The Jesuits, and later the Franciscans, ran the mission from its inception to 1994 before passing it on to the Roman Catholic Archdiocese of Harare under the control of Father William Makusha and subsequently Father Regis Chikuni and Father Chiduku.

The school has been one of the more competitive schools from Wedza and was the second school in the district to introduce GCE Advanced Level classes with the inception of management of business, accounting and geography classes in 2000. Classes have expanded to include English literature and science subjects.

Sports
Athletics, basketball, chess, football, netball and volleyball are the main sports played by the school. The school's greatest accomplishment was winning the NASH Mashonaland East football tournament in 1989 and also a gold medal in chess by Liberty Butsu in 2012. Another notable achievement was the gold medal won by Tafara Magaya in Basketball at the National Championships in 2014.  He was subsequently selected to represent Zimbabwe at the zone 6 regional championships in 2015 where he was awarded another gold medal.

Primary school
The primary school, also referred to as Chikohonono after the hill in its backdrop, serves the area surrounding the mission with day-schooling services.

Notable alumni 

 Constantino Chiwenga – Vice President of Zimbabwe and formerly Commander, Zimbabwe Defence Forces 
Stephen Mahere – Zimbabwean Minister of Education, Sport, Arts and Culture
 Shepherd Maingano – Professor, Clinical Laboratory Science at University of Hawaii
 Felix Makonye – Associate Professor, College of Law & Management Studies, Westville Campus, University of KwaZulu-Natal
 Godwin Marufu – former school captain, HIV Researcher, Family Physician
 Louis Chasakara – former Group Operations Director of Rainbow Tourism Group
 Cuthbert Musarurwa – Professor University of Rwanda, College of Medicine and Health Sciences.
 Perrance Shiri – commander, Air Force of Zimbabwe; member, Zimbabwean Joint Operations Command

See also

 Roman Catholicism in Zimbabwe
 List of schools in Zimbabwe

References

1954 establishments in Southern Rhodesia
Buildings and structures in Mashonaland East Province
Education in Mashonaland East Province
Educational institutions established in 1954
Franciscan high schools
Defunct Jesuit schools
Catholic elementary and primary schools in Zimbabwe
Catholic secondary schools in Zimbabwe
Wedza District